Star in the Dust is a 1956 American Western film directed by Charles F. Haas and starring John Agar, Mamie Van Doren and Richard Boone.

In the town of Gunlock, sheriff Bill Jorden is due to hang Sam Hall for cattle-stealing. Jorden has to contend, however, with various citizens, including the cowboys who want to rescue Hall and the cattlemen and farmers who want to lynch him. Hall, meanwhile, is planning his escape with girlfriend Nellie.

Plot
In the late 1800s in the western town of Gunlock, gunslinger Sam Hall, who has murdered three farmers, is scheduled to be hanged at sundown. Sheriff Bill Jorden faces opposition from the cattlemen’s association, who had hired Hall to kill the farmers as part of a plot to acquire more grazing land. A group of farmers, fearing that the cattlemen will spring the killer before he is hanged, want the sheriff to hang Hall as quickly as possible. Fearing violence between the ranchers and farmers, Jorden tries to call for additional help but discovers that the telegraph line serving the town has been cut. Informed that the farmers are headed to town to kill Hall, Bill meets them and reasons with them to allow the law to handle Hall’s punishment. On the morning of the hanging, Jorden brings out Hall, threatening to shoot the prisoner himself if anyone tries to stop the hanging but before Hall is executed, the ranchers set the gallows on fire, precipitating a gun battle between opposing factions. Hall is eventually hanged and the cattlemen are brought to justice.

Cast

 John Agar as Sheriff Bill Jorden
 Mamie Van Doren as Ellen Ballard
 Richard Boone as  Sam Hall
 Coleen Gray as  Nellie Mason
 Leif Erickson as George Ballard
 James Gleason as Orval Jones
 Randy Stuart as Nan Hogan
 Terry Gilkyson as The Music Man
 Paul Fix as Mike MacNamara
 Harry Morgan as Lew Hogan
 Stuart Randall as Jess Ryman
 Robert Osterloh as Rigdon
 Stanley Andrews as Ben Smith
 John Day as Jiggs Larribee
 Stafford Repp as Leo Roos
 Lewis Martin as Pastor Harris
 Renny McEvoy as Timothy Brown
 Jess Kirkpatrick as Ed Pardee
 James Parnell as Mary Tremain
 Anthony Jochim as Doc Quinn
 Clint Eastwood as Tom, a ranch hand (uncredited)

Production
The film included an early appearance of Clint Eastwood, who played a very small role as a ranch hand.

One of the movie's scenes features Coleen Gray and Randy Stuart fighting for possession of incriminating letters hidden in a suitcase. The actresses invited their husbands to watch the scene's filming, which lasted over 50 seconds and included both women punching and wrestling each other. At the conclusion of the choreographed scene, Gray recalled in a later interview, the women simply dusted themselves off, but the two husbands ..."were pale and clammy and weak in the knees" having watched their wives engage in a lengthy fistfight.

See also
 List of American films of 1956

References

External links
 
 
 

1956 films
1956 Western (genre) films
American Western (genre) films
Films based on American novels
Films based on Western (genre) novels
Films directed by Charles F. Haas
Films scored by Frank Skinner
Universal Pictures films
1956 directorial debut films
Revisionist Western (genre) films
1950s English-language films
1950s American films